Yi-seul, also spelled I-seul or E-seul, is a Korean unisex given name. Unlike most Korean names, which are composed of two Sino-Korean roots each written with one hanja, "Yiseul" is an indigenous Korean name: a single word meaning "dew". It is one of a number of such indigenous names which became more popular in South Korea in the late 20th century.

People
People with this name include:
 An Yi-seul (born 1992), South Korean speed skater
 Chun Yi-seul (born 1989), South Korean actress and model
 Heo Yi-seul (born 1988), South Korean actress
 Kang Yi-seul, South Korean actress and model
 Kim Yi-seul (baseball player) (born 1984), South Korean baseball player
 Kim I-seul (athlete) (born 1989), South Korean sepak takraw player
 Kim E-seul (model) (born 1990), South Korean model and Miss Earth Korea winner

Fictional characters
Fictional characters with this name include:
 Choi Yi-seul, in the 2002 South Korean television series Magic Kid Masuri
 Ham Yi-seul, in the 2012 South Korean television series Operation Proposal
 Kim Yi-seul, in the 2014 South Korean film Whistle Blower
 Hong Yi-seul, in the 2015 South Korean television series Bubble Gum

See also
List of Korean given names

References

Given names
Korean unisex given names